Goirle is a municipality and town in the southern Netherlands, in the province of North Brabant. Part of the suburban area of the city of Tilburg, it shares with it its phone area code and public transport system.

The municipality also includes the villages of Breehees and Riel.

Topography

Dutch Topographic map of the municipality of Goirle, June 2015

Notable people 

 Max Steenberghe (1899–1972) a Dutch politician and Govt. minister
 John Boxtel (born 1930) a Dutch sculptor of woodcarvings and an art teacher 
 Pepijn van Erp (born 1972) a Dutch mathematician, skeptical activist and chess player 
 Jan Taminiau (born 1975) a Dutch clothes designer
 Floor Jansen (born 1981) a Dutch singer, songwriter and lead vocalist of Finnish symphonic metal band Nightwish

Sport 
 Tiest van Gestel (1881–1969) an archer and team gold medallist at the 1920 Summer Olympics
 Huub Zilverberg (born 1939) a Dutch former professional road bicycle racer
 Martin van Geel (born 1960) a retired Dutch footballer with over 430 club caps
 Mathieu Hermans (born 1963) a former Dutch professional road bicycle racer
 Roy Hendriksen (born 1969) a Dutch professional football manager, coach and former player with 438 club caps
 Edwin Hermans (born 1974) a Dutch former footballer with over 360 club caps
 Amanda Hopmans (born 1976) a former professional tennis player
 Björn van der Doelen (born 1976) a retired football midfielder with 249 club caps and a singer/songwriter 
 Marcel Meeuwis (born 1980) is a Dutch former footballer with 300 club caps
 Joris Mathijsen (born 1980) a Dutch former footballer with 409 club caps
 Ireen Wüst (born 1986) a Dutch long track allround speed skater, winner of eleven Olympic medals
 Eefje Muskens (born 1989) a Dutch badminton player, competed in the 2016 Summer Olympics
 Michael Kuiper (born 1989 in Riel) a Dutch mixed martial artist
 Virgil Misidjan (born 1993) a Dutch footballer

Gallery

See also 
 Van Gool, a Dutch surname meaning "from Goirle".

References

External links

Official website

 
Municipalities of North Brabant
Populated places in North Brabant